Pectinifera is a monotypic moth genus of the family Erebidae. Its only species, Pectinifera sypnaesimilis, is found in the Democratic Republic of the Congo. Both the genus and species were first described by Emilio Berio in 1964.

References

Calpinae
Monotypic moth genera